Trinchesia kuiteri is a species of sea slug, an aeolid nudibranch, a marine gastropod mollusc in the family Trinchesiidae.

Distribution
This species was described from Green Point, Sydney Harbour, New South Wales, Australia.

Ecology
Trinchesia kuiteri feeds on the sponge associated solitary hydroid Zyzzyzus spongicola. In a remarkable adaptation the cerata have tentacle-like filaments which mimic the tentacles of the hydroid.

References 

 Coleman N. (2008) Nudibranchs encyclopedia, catalogue of Asia/Indo-Pacific sea slugs. Neville Coleman's Underwater Geographic Pty Ltd, Queensland, Australia, 416 pp

Trinchesiidae
Gastropods described in 1981